The following is a list of the monastic houses in Cornwall, England.

Map

Key to listing

See also

 List of monastic houses in England

Notes

References

Further reading
 Oliver, George (1846) Monasticon Dioecesis Exoniensis: being a collection of records and instruments illustrating the ancient conventual, collegiate, and eleemosynary foundations, in the Counties of Cornwall and Devon, with historical notices, and a supplement, comprising a list of the dedications of churches in the Diocese, an amended edition of the taxation of Pope Nicholas, and an abstract of the Chantry Rolls [with supplement and index]. Exeter: P. A. Hannaford, 1846, 1854, 1889
 Olson, Lynette (1989) Early Monasteries in Cornwall (Studies in Celtic History series). Woodbridge: Boydell Press  
 Orme, Nicholas (2007) Cornwall and the Cross. Chichester: Phillimore; English Heritage
 Orme, Nicholas (1996) English Church Dedications: with a Survey of Cornwall and Devon, University of Exeter Press 

History of Cornwall
Archaeological sites in Cornwall
Christianity in Anglo-Saxon England
Houses in Cornwall

Cornwall
Lists of buildings and structures in Cornwall
Cornwall
Medieval Cornwall